Kursky is a rural locality (a khutor) in Sergiyevskoye Rural Settlement of Giaginsky District, Adygea, Russia. The population was 127 as of 2018. There are 5 streets.

Geography 
The khutor is located on the right bank of the Fars River, 37 km southeast of Giaginskaya (the district's administrative centre) by road. Sergiyevskoye is the nearest rural locality.

References 

Rural localities in Giaginsky District